The Pine Log State Forest is in the U.S. state of Florida. The  forest is located in the panhandle, near Ebro. It was established in 1936 and is Florida's oldest state forest.

Facilities and activities available include camping, swimming, fishing, boat ramp, picnicking, bicycling, horseback riding, hiking and nature trails

References

External links
 Pine Log State Forest: Florida Forest Service - FDACS

Florida state forests
Protected areas established in 1936
Protected areas of Bay County, Florida
Protected areas of Washington County, Florida